Municipal elections to the Central Municipal Council (CMC) in Qatar were held for the sixth time on 16 April 2019. The official number of people who voted is 13,334, about 1/13th of the Qatari population, and nine percent lower than in 2015.

Results
Several "young, relatively unknown" candidates were elected in the place of several well-known establishment candidates.

Analysis
A Qatar University pre-election opinion poll found that the most likely reasons for Qataris not intending to vote for the CMC were a lack of time, the CMC's lack of real political power, and the lack of an acceptable candidate.

References

Municipal elections in Qatar
Elections in Qatar
Qatar
2019 in Qatar
Election and referendum articles with incomplete results